A trading fund is an executive agency, government department or often simply a part of a department, that enables the department to handle its own revenues and expenses separately from overall government finances and more like a business, as opposed to having to obtain funding from the government's legislature and feeding income back into its treasury. A Hong Kong governmental study of trading funds in the UK and Hong Kong describes their nature and purpose as follows:

Each country has its own specific laws and regulations controlling the establishment and use of trading funds. Trading funds in the UK were initially established through the Government Trading Funds Act 1973, and modified by the Government Trading Act 1990, along with other modifications through finance legislation. In 1993, Hong Kong followed suit with its Trading Funds Ordinance of that year. Establishment and operation of a Hong Kong trading fund is subject to decisions made by the Legislative Council on the recommendation of the Financial Secretary.

The significance of a UK trading fund is that it has standing authority under the 1973 Act to use its receipts to meet its expenses or outgoings. Some trading funds have, as their main function, the collection and supply of information to both public and private sectors; others do not. Also in the UK, a trading fund can only be established with the agreement of HM Treasury. To establish a fund, more than 50% of the trading fund's revenue will consist of receipts for goods and services provided by the department, and where the responsible minister and the Treasury are satisfied that the setting up of the trading fund will lead to "improved efficiency and effectiveness in management of operations".

List of trading funds
Date of establishment as trading fund is shown:

United Kingdom

Current 
Companies House - 1 October 1991
Crown Commercial Service - 1 April 1991 (first known as the Buying Agency, then OGCbuying.solutions, then Buying Solutions, then the Government Procurement Service)
Driver & Vehicle Agency (DVA) - 1 April 2007 (owned by the Northern Ireland Executive)
FCDO Services - 1 April 2008
HM Land Registry - 1 April 1993
Intellectual Property Office - 1 October 1991 (first known as the Patent Office)
Medicines and Healthcare products Regulatory Agency (MHRA) - 1 April 2003
Meteorological Office - 1 April 1996
Ordnance Survey - 1 April 1999 (became holding entity of Ordnance Survey Ltd on 1 April 2015 )
Queen Elizabeth II Conference Centre - 1 April 1997
Registers of Scotland - 1 April 1996 (owned by the Scottish Government)
Royal Mint - 1 April 1975 (became holding entity of Royal Mint Ltd on 31 December 2009)
United Kingdom Hydrographic Office (UKHO) - 1 April 1996

Previous 
Defence Science and Technology Laboratory (Dstl) - 1 July 2001 (became an Executive Agency on 1 April 2016)
Driver and Vehicle Licensing Agency (DVLA) - 1 April 2004 (trading fund status removed on 1 April 2011)
Driver and Vehicle Standards Agency (DVSA) - 1 April 2015 (trading fund status removed on 1 April 2021)

Defunct 
Army Base Repair Organisation (ABRO) – 1 April 2002 (merged with DARA to form DSG on 1 April 2008)
Central Office of Information (COI) – 1 April 1991 (abolished in March 2012)
Chessington Computer Centre – 1 April 1993 (privatised in July 1996)
Crown Suppliers - 1 April 1976 (first known as the Supplies Division of the Property Services Agency and abolished in March 1991)
Defence Aviation Repair Agency (DARA) - 1 April 2001 (merged with ABRO to form DSG on 1 April 2008)
Defence Evaluation and Research Agency (DERA) - 1 April 1995 (split into Dstl and Qinetiq on 1 July 2001)
Defence Research Agency (DRA) - 1 April 1993 (became part of DERA on 1 April 1995)
Defence Support Group (DSG) - 1 April 2008 (privatised in April 2015)
Driver and Vehicle Testing Agency (DVTA) - 1 April 1996 (merged with Driver and Vehicle Licensing Northern Ireland to form DVA on 1 April 2007)
Driving Standards Agency (DSA) - 1 April 1997 (merged with VOSA to form the DVSA on 1 April 2015)
Fire Service College (FSC) - 1 April 1992 (privatised in February 2013)
Forensic Science Service (FSS) - 1 April 1999 (became government-owned company in December 2005)
HM Stationery Office (HMSO) - 1 April 1980 (privatised as The Stationery Office in September 1996)
Medicines Control Agency (MCA) - 1 April 1993 (merged with Medical Devices Agency to form MHRA on 1 April 2003)
NHS Estates - 1 April 1999 (abolished in September 2005)
Royal Ordnance Factories - 1 July 1974 (privatised as Royal Ordnance in April 1987)
Vehicle and Operator Services Agency (VOSA) - 1 April 2003 (merged with the DSA to form the DVSA on 1 April 2015)
Vehicle Inspectorate - 1 April 1991 (merged with Traffic Area Network to form VOSA on 1 April 2003)

Hong Kong 
Companies Registry – 1 August 1993
Electrical and Mechanical Services - 1 August 1996 
Hongkong Post - 1 August 1995
Land Registry - 1 August 1993
Office of the Telecommunications Authority (OFTA) - 1 June 1995
Sewage Services - 11 March 1994 (trading fund status removed on 31 March 1998)

References

 
 
Hong Kong Government